In contract bridge, the Gardener one notrump overcall (also known as comic notrump) is an overcall of 1NT denoting either a 16-18 balanced hand (as natural), or a weak hand with a long suit (6 card).

It is named after British player Nico Gardener. The partner, if interested in game, checks the "seriousness" of the overcall by bidding 2, and the overcaller responds 2NT with real notrump overcall, and corrects to a suit (or passes with clubs) if weak. It dates back to the times when jump overcalls denoted intermediate or strong hands with a single suit. The convention presents a psychic bid with control, thus it can be subject to restrictions for use on certain levels of competition.

References

Bridge conventions